IU...IM is the second Korean-language extended play (EP) by South Korean singer-songwriter IU. It was released by LOEN Entertainment on November 12, 2009.

Track listing

Notes
 The song contains uncredited rapping by Zico of block b who was then a trainee.

Charts

Singles
"Marshmallow "

References

External links
  IU's official website
 

2009 EPs
IU (singer) EPs
Korean-language EPs
Kakao M EPs